The Olmsted Family Farmhouse, also known as the Olmsted-Urban House, is an historic building located in Urbandale, Iowa, United States. Leander and Charlotte Olmsted from Auburn, New York acquired  of land in Polk County, Iowa in 1867. They built a house on the property where they raised their sons Millard and Clarence, and bought additional land for their farm. In 1904, about the time Millard married his wife Olive, Leander had this two-story, frame, American foursquare house built.

Millard and Olive helped Leander farm and they raised their six children here. Both Millard and his brother Clarence were influential in the formation of Urbandale in 1917 with Clarence serving on the first town council and Millard on the school board. In 1937,  of the farm were platted for building lots. Karl and Matie Urban acquired the house in 1947, and the Urbandale Historic Society bought the house from their estate in 1987. They converted it into their headquarters and to house their collection of Urbandale memorabilia. The house was listed on the National Register of Historic Places in 2019.

References

Houses completed in 1904
Houses in Polk County, Iowa
Urbandale, Iowa
National Register of Historic Places in Polk County, Iowa
Houses on the National Register of Historic Places in Iowa
Historic house museums in Iowa
Museums in Polk County, Iowa
American Foursquare architecture in Iowa